Alberto Undiano Mallenco (born 6 October 1973) is a retired Spanish football referee. He was a full international referee for FIFA from 2004 to 2019. Undiano is also a part-time sociologist.

Career
Mallenco was born in Pamplona.

Club
On 8 May 2019, Mallenco refereed the 2018–19 Armenian Cup between Alashkert and Lori.

He refereed in La Liga from 2000 to 2019.

International

2007 FIFA U-20 World Cup
Undiano was selected as a referee for the 2007 FIFA U-20 World Cup in Canada, where he refereed the match between Canada and Chile on 1 July 2007. He also refereed the final match between Argentina and Czech Republic on 23 July 2007.

2010 FIFA World Cup
Undiano was selected as a referee for the 2010 FIFA World Cup in South Africa. He was the only Spanish referee at the 2010 FIFA World Cup. The group stage game between Germany and Serbia resulted in a 1–0 win for Serbia. Undiano gave a second yellow card to German player Miroslav Klose in the 36th minute, thus resulting in a red card. In the 59th minute Nemanja Vidić received a yellow card for handball, also resulting in a penalty. Undiano awarded yellow cards to Klose (2), Branislav Ivanović, Aleksandar Kolarov, Sami Khedira, Philipp Lahm, Neven Subotić, Bastian Schweinsteiger and Nemanja Vidić – a total of nine yellow cards.

Nations League
He refereed the 2019 UEFA Nations League Final. It was his last game as a professional referee.

Honours
 Don Balón Award (Best Spanish Referee) : 2005 and 2007

See also
 List of football referees

References

External links
 
 
 
 
 

1973 births
Living people
Sportspeople from Pamplona
Spanish football referees
Spanish sociologists
UEFA Champions League referees
2010 FIFA World Cup referees